Coombesdale is a small settlement in Staffordshire, England.

External links
Coombesdale at Streetmap.co.uk

Villages in Staffordshire